The KEE to Bala, originally called "Dunn's Pavilion," is a concert venue and bar located on Lake Muskoka, in the town of Bala, Ontario, Canada. Dunn's Pavilion was originally purchased by owner Gerry Dunn in 1929, and built into a concert hall in 1930 with the aim of hosting big bands. Back in the 1930s the slogan for the concert hall was, "Where All of Muskoka Dances." The name was changed to The KEE to Bala in the late 1960s after changing ownership twice.

History

Gerry Patrick Dunn purchased the property in 1929 when there was only a small ice cream parlour and drugstore on the lot. Dunn started renovating the buildings in the second year of ownership in order to be able to host orchestras as an attraction in the small town. The first two bands to play in the renovated building were Jerry Richardson and the Varsity Collegians, and Carl Mueller's Varsity Entertainers.

At the end of the 1930s, Dunn decided to tear down the old building in order to be able to host the bigger bands he desired, and provide more room for people to dance. The expansion was built by Gerry Dunn himself, as well as 14 additional workers. It is said that while the construction was taking place you could often see him sitting on the roof, anchoring down the supports. "'I designed the pavilion myself – no architect was involved,' says Dunn, who at 97 years old was back at his Bala summer home in 1998."

The new building was completed in the summer of 1942; built with the stage backdrop to be a façade of an actual small cottage. Dunn renovated the dance floor and was expanded from 35 feet to 100 feet. They hosted small house bands and dancing 6 nights a week, and big bands once a week throughout the summer months. People would dress up in their finest attire and make a night of dancing. Customers would have to bring their own alcohol after the prohibition and during the depression years because most venues didn't have the licenses to sell it because it was very expensive to obtain the license.   On the nights of the Big Bands, Dunn would try to attract people from the cities and towns surrounding Bala, as well as attracting people from Toronto who would enjoy a weekend away.

New ownership

In 1963, at the age of 62, Gerry Dunn sold Dunn's Pavilion to Ray Cockburn. Ray had owned a similar venue in Orillia called 'The Pavalon' and wanted to expand his ownership in the bar business. In order to take advantage of the new rock and roll style of music, Ray renamed the venue and called it The KEE to Bala. "Says Ray, 'A short name, easily remembered, was what I wanted, and when someone suggested that the pavilion was the `key' to Bala and the surrounding Muskoka area, I jumped at the idea and changed the spelling to KEE.'"   The KEE had wonderful years throughout the 1960s and 1970s under Ray's ownership. This was because Ray promised the bands that they could play in Orillia one night, and in Bala the next night making it worth the detour. Normally bands wouldn't travel two hours north of the major cities in order to perform, but after they played in Toronto they often liked visiting relaxing venues to play for smaller crowds.

In the 1970s the Parry family approached Ray Cockburn wanting to buy out The KEE; they owned it throughout the 1970s and 1980s. They updated the venue to make it more of a bar by obtaining a liquor license, building a new stage, and installing bars so that it was no longer BYOB.

After this it was sold to Joe Kondyjowski who had a lot of experience in the dance hall business. He took over in the 1980s and brought in large rock and roll crowds. Joe made enough money in order to cover the expenses to fix up the old wooden building, create a parking lot, install a new roof, build a new deck, and put in cement cribs to fix the fact that the building was starting to sink. He installed a new kitchen in order to serve food in addition to the alcohol at the bars, while updating the colour scheme to give the venue a "Cape Cod" feel.

Joe Kondyjowski sold The KEE in 1990 to Sanober Patel who was assisted by her son Jim. Sanober brought in a weekly comedy night in order to try to obtain more business from a larger variety of people as well as a big band event to attract the old clientele that used to attend.

Present

In 1995, The KEE was sold to a partnership; Stephen Wylie was one of the partners and he took over the operations of the business. Stephen understood the importance that the venue had for many people and tried to hold onto the history in the building. He repainted it back to the original colours and even brought back Big Band dances where the band would use the original stage.

The building has now been called "The KEE to Bala" for over 30 years. The dress code has since changed from formal attire to casual clothing with the music changing to fit with the new generations.

Artists
The more notable musicians and bands who have played the KEE include the following:

54-40 (band)
Aerosmith
Akon
April Wine
Alannah Myles
Arkells
Avicii
Baka Not Nice
The Beaches
Big Wreck
Big Sugar
Blue Rodeo
Brett Kissel
Burton Cummings
Cab Calloway
Classified
Chad Brownlee
City and Colour
Colin James
Count Basie
Cypress Hill
David Wilcox
The Dorsey Brothers
Doug and the Slugs
Down With Webster
Drake
Duke Ellington
Finger Eleven
George Thorogood
The Glenn Miller Orchestra
The Glorious Sons
Great Big Sea
Guy Lombardo
Hinder
Hollerado
James Barker Band
Jazz Cartier
Jeff Healey
July Talk
Kim Mitchell
Lawrence Gowan
Lee Aaron
Les Brown
Les Elgart
Lighthouse
Loud Luxury
Louis Armstrong
Marianas Trench
Mart Kenney
Matthew Good Band
Max Webster
Monster Truck (band)
Mötley Crüe
Nazareth
New York Dolls 
The Ramones
The Reklaws
Roy Woods
RUSH
The Sam Roberts Band
Shaggy
The Sheepdogs
Sloan
Snoop Dogg
The Stampeders
Steve Aoki
Sum 41
Teenage Head
Theory of a Deadman
Three Days Grace
Tim Hicks
Tiny Tim
Tom Cochrane
The Tragically Hip
The Trews
Woody Herman

References

External links
The KEE to Bala

Buildings and structures in the District Municipality of Muskoka
Concert halls in Canada
Music venues in Ontario